Nassarius irus is a species of sea snail, a marine gastropod mollusk in the family Nassariidae, the nassa mud snails or dog whelks.

Description
The length of the shell varies between 9.8 mm and 20 mm.

Distribution
This species occurs in the Indian Ocean off Madagascar.

References

 Cernohorsky W. O. (1984). Systematics of the family Nassariidae (Mollusca: Gastropoda). Bulletin of the Auckland Institute and Museum 14: 1–356
 Bozzetti L. (2006) Nassarius (Plicarcularia) cussottii sp. n. (Gastropoda: Prosobranchia: Nassariidae) dal Madagascar Sud-Orientale. Malacologia Mostra Mondiale 50: 13–14
 Marais J.P. & Kilburn R.N. (2010) Nassariidae. pp. 138–173, in: Marais A.P. & Seccombe A.D. (eds), Identification guide to the seashells of South Africa. Volume 1. Groenkloof: Centre for Molluscan Studies. 376 pp.

External links
 Martens, E. von. (1880). Mollusken. Pp. 179-353, pl. 19-22 In K. Möbius, F. Richters & E. von Martens, Beiträge zur Meeresfauna der Insel Mauritius und der Seychellen. Berlin: Gutmann.
 

Nassariidae
Gastropods described in 1880